The Southland Conference Men's Basketball Player of the Year is a basketball award given to the Southland Conference's (SLC) most outstanding player. The award was first given following the conference's inaugural basketball season of 1963–64. Five players have won the award two times: Jerry Rook, Larry Jeffries, Andrew Toney, Ryan Stuart and Thomas Walkup. No player has ever won three times. McNeese has the most all-time winners with eight. Among current SLC members, three have never had a winner: Houston Christian and Incarnate Word, both of which joined in 2013, and Texas A&M–Commerce, which plays its first SLC season in 2022–23.

Key

Winners

Winners by school

Footnotes

References
General
 

Specific

NCAA Division I men's basketball conference players of the year
Player of the Year
Awards established in 1964